Daniel Isaac Axelrod (July 16, 1910 – June 2, 1998) was an American paleoecologist specializing in Tertiary Cordilleran floras, in particular correlating fossil evidence of specific floras with climate change indicators.

Biography
He received his A.B. in botany, and an M.A. and Ph.D. in paleobotany from the University of California at Berkeley.  He served in the United States Army during World War II performing strategic analysis of aerial photographs of terrane.  After the war he was hired as an assistant professor of geology at the University of California at Los Angeles.  He eventually became a full professor of both geology and botany at UCLA before moving to the University of California at Davis as a professor of paleoecology late in his career.  He became professor emeritus at Davis in 1976. He was elected a Fellow of the American Academy of Arts and Sciences in 1981.

His collections of fossil type floras are housed at the University of California Museum of Paleontology

Awards 
 Hayden Memorial Geological Award, 1979
 Paleontological Society Medal, 1990

See also
Harry Paul Bailey

References

External links 
UCMP Paleobotany collection catalogs

1910 births
1998 deaths
20th-century American geologists
United States Army personnel of World War II
Fellows of the American Academy of Arts and Sciences
UC Berkeley College of Letters and Science alumni
University of California, Davis faculty
University of California, Los Angeles faculty